The Venus Butterfly is a term used for various sexual techniques, one of which was the subject of the 1988 book The One Hour Orgasm. It was first publicly mentioned in a 1986 episode of the American television drama L.A. Law. However, a technique of the same name appears in the book The Sensuous Woman, which was first published in 1969.

L.A. Law television episode
In an episode of L.A. Law titled "The Venus Butterfly", which first aired on November 21, 1986, a man who is unimpressive in appearance and personality but who nevertheless has tremendous success with women claims to have a sexual technique that has caused this success. He reveals it to his lawyer, Stuart Markowitz (Michael Tucker). The technique itself is never described to the audience. In a hotel bedroom scene, it is implied that Markowitz uses the technique on his girlfriend, Ann Kelsey (Jill Eikenberry), with great positive effect. According to authors Tim Brooks & Earle Marsh, the Venus Butterfly was pivotal in Kelsey and Markowitz becoming a long-term couple.

The writer of that section of the episode, Terry Louise Fisher, stated that she had just made it up. The show received many letters and phone calls from viewers asking what it was and two requests to license the term. Playboy magazine did a feature speculating on what the technique was and included suggestions from readers. Years later, actors on the show reported still being asked about it.

Sue Johanson variation
As described by writer and sex educator Sue Johanson in 2005, the Venus Butterfly is a variant of cunnilingus. It involves using one's tongue on a woman's clitoris, using one's fingers on her vagina, and using the other hand in the perineal area, "even penetrating the rectum [i.e., anus] if that is pleasurable for her." A similar description was given in a 2004 episode of the TV series Rescue Me.

The One Hour Orgasm variation
The 1988 book The One Hour Orgasm: How to Learn the Amazing "Venus Butterfly" Technique, by Leah and Bob Schwartz, is dedicated to educating readers on how to perform the technique. In this variation, either the woman or man is lying down. Their partner, sitting next to them with their legs positioned around each other very gently, with just a minimal amount of pressure (the "touch" of a butterfly's wing, at least on the clitoris) stimulates the clitoris or the hood, with the penis at the two-o'clock or ten-o'clock position. The book suggests keeping the clitoral shaft steady, with one thumb lying gently along and beside it and the other lying lengthwise within the vagina but not moving deep within it. A lubricant is recommended throughout. The light pressure continues using the same speed until a peak is reached close to orgasm, but not quite (although it can be continued if multiple orgasms are the goal). The speed is slowed down or stopped but very soon continues again, and the person is brought back near orgasm or given a second or third orgasm. This orgasm control on the part of the person providing the technique can be learned over time with a particular partner. The technique can be sustained, "surfing" near the orgasm but occasionally stopping, for a very long time, hence the term "One Hour Orgasm".

The book is mentioned in the film Meet the Fockers. A set of videotapes (for him and her) were later made by the Schwartzs, showing how the technique is performed.

See also
 Coitus reservatus 
 Eroto-comatose lucidity
 Sex position

References 
 

Oral eroticism
1986 in American television
Cunnilingus
Sexual acts
Sexuality in fiction